Operation Camden was an Australian Army in support of the 501 Land Clearing Company, United States Army Corps of Engineers who were undertaking land clearing operations in the Hat Dich area. A large contact took place on 21 August 1969 during Operation Camden south of the Hat Dich Secret Zone in Phuoc Tuy Province against Viet Cong forces. The battle was fought between 3 Platoon and the Assault Pioneer Platoon of the 5th Battalion, Royal Australian Regiment (5RAR) and the Viet Cong 3rd Battalion, 274th Regiment.

Notes

External links
5 RAR Association - Battle of Hat Dich

Conflicts in 1969
1969 in Vietnam
Battles and operations of the Vietnam War
Battles of the Vietnam War involving Australia
Battles involving the United States
Battles involving Vietnam
History of Bà Rịa-Vũng Tàu Province